Rudolf Fickeisen (15 May 1885 – 22 July 1944) was a German rower who competed in the 1912 Summer Olympics. He was a member of the German boat, which won the gold medal in the coxed fours.

References

External links

1885 births
1944 deaths
Rowers at the 1912 Summer Olympics
Olympic rowers of Germany
Olympic gold medalists for Germany
Olympic medalists in rowing
German male rowers
Medalists at the 1912 Summer Olympics